The  Korea Professional Baseball season was the 31st season in the history of the Korea Professional Baseball. The Samsung Lions won the regular season and Korean series.

Season structure

Regular season
Each team played 133 games during the regular season.

All-Star Game
On 21 July, the best players participate in the Korean All-Star Game. The franchises participating are divided into two regions: Eastern League (Samsung Lions, Doosan Bears, Lotte Giants, SK Wyverns) and Western League (Kia Tigers, Hanwha Eagles, LG Twins, Nexen Heroes). The titles 'Eastern' and 'Western' do not directly correspond to the geographical regions of the franchises involved, as both SK and Doosan, being from Incheon and Seoul respectively, are clearly based in the Western region of Korea, despite representing the East. Unlike in the MLB, the Korean All-Star Game does not determine home-field advantage in the Korean Series. The most recent Korean All-Star Game was played in Seoul. 2012 Korean All-Star Game won 5-2 by the Eastern League.

Postseason
Korea Professional Baseball season culminates in its championship series, known as the Korean Series. Currently, the top four teams qualify for the postseason based on win–loss records. The team with the best record gains a direct entry into the Korean Series, while the other three teams compete for the remaining place in a step-ladder playoff system:

Semi-Playoff (best-of-five, added from 3 games starting from 2008)
Regular Season 3rd place vs. Regular Season 4th place
Playoff (best-of-five, reduced from 7 games starting from 2009)
Regular Season 2nd place vs. Semi-Playoff Winner
Korean Series (best-of-seven)
Regular Season 1st place vs. Playoff Winner

Any playoff games are no draw playing until the end, so originally scheduled 5 or 7 games.

To Determine the Final Standings
Champion (1st place): Korean Series Winner
Runner-up (2nd place): Korean Series Loser
3rd–8th place: Sort by Regular Season record except teams to play in the Korean Series.

Standings

Postseason

Semi-Playoff

Playoff

Korean Series

Foreign players 
For the first time since 1997, there are no foreign hitters in the KBO, as all eight teams use their foreign player allotments on pitchers.

References

External links
Official Site

KBO League seasons
Korea Professional Baseball Season, 2012
Korea Korea Professional Baseball season